The Jacksons Mill Covered Bridge is a historic wooden covered bridge located at East Providence Township in Bedford County, Pennsylvania. It crosses Brush Creek. It is one of 15 historic covered bridges in Bedford County.

It was listed on the National Register of Historic Places in 1980.

See also
List of bridges documented by the Historic American Engineering Record in Pennsylvania

References

External links

Covered bridges on the National Register of Historic Places in Pennsylvania
Covered bridges in Bedford County, Pennsylvania
Bridges completed in 1889
Bridges in Bedford County, Pennsylvania
Historic American Engineering Record in Pennsylvania
Wooden bridges in Pennsylvania
1889 establishments in Pennsylvania
National Register of Historic Places in Bedford County, Pennsylvania
Road bridges on the National Register of Historic Places in Pennsylvania
Burr Truss bridges in the United States